See digital television for more technical details.

In Malaysia, digital television broadcasts, DTV or DHD, can be received via cable, internet, satellite, or via free over-the-air (OTA) digital terrestrial television - much like analogue television broadcasts have been. It began in the mid-1990s with the introduction of the Astro satellite television service, now followed by new paid television services in the 2000s, as well as the digitalisation of over-the-air TV which was expected to be complete by the mid-2010s before being shelved. This article discusses various platforms where DTV is applied in Malaysia, including Digital Video Broadcasting (DVB) (DVB-S/DVB-S2 for satellite and DVB-T2 for over-the-air) and Internet Protocol Television (IPTV). Following its successful nationwide digital transition on 31 October 2019, the country became the third in Southeast Asia with digital broadcasts after neighbouring Brunei and Singapore.

DTV systems

Satellite television 
The DTV era in Malaysia began with the introduction of direct broadcast pay television service, Astro, in 1996 as part of commercialisation of space. Astro now transmits about 130 local and international TV channels in the MPEG-2 video format through the Ku band utilising the MEASAT satellite system's transponders, according to the DVB-S standard. Astro's transmission is especially susceptible to rain fade, and complaints of interruption during wet weather are not uncommon in Malaysia with a tropical climate. On December 2011, Malaysia government announced that free satellite television, NJOI will be available to customer starting February 2012.

Digital terrestrial TV

Free-to-air
In 2005, the Ministry of Information announced their plan to digitalise nationwide free-to-air TV broadcasts led by Radio Televisyen Malaysia (RTM). Trial broadcasts were undertaken, involving one thousand households in the Klang Valley from September 2006 till February 2007. According to the then-Deputy Minister of Information, Chia Kwang Chye, the trial received "very positive" feedback, i.e. "more than 60 percent said the quality of the signal ranged from good to better. Over 88 percent said the picture quality improved, while 70 percent said the sound quality was better".

According to Information Minister Datuk Ahmad Shabery Cheek, it was anticipated that RTM would fully complete its digitalisation in 2012 as part of its three-year restructuring process. It was anticipated that each household, once equipped with the necessary equipment (set-top box, iDTV or DHD set) would receive up to 19 channels, seven of which would fall under RTM and the rest for private broadcasters such as TV3, ntv7, 8TV and TV9. Thus far, besides simulcasting TV1 and TV2, RTM is currently airing RTMi, Muzik Aktif and Arena exclusively on the digital TV platform, transmitted at UHF channel 44, modulated at 64QAM, in test forms. RTM was also expected to launch regional channels for each state and/or territory in Malaysia; increasing to 20 television channels. Media Prima has started trials on March 2009.

Malaysia and all other Association of Southeast Asian Nations (ASEAN) (with the exception of Cambodia and Laos, which they selected the DTMB instead, and the Philippines, which selected ISDB-T instead) had selected DVB-T as the final DTV standard, and were expected to switch off analogue broadcasts completely by 2015. In June 2008, participants of the 6th ASEAN Digital Broadcast Meeting from seven Southeast Asian countries (including Malaysia) agreed to finalise the specifications of the DTV set-top box for use within ASEAN, and also set up an ASEAN HD Centre to provide training on HDTV content to broadcasters in the region.

Despite a success of RTM's pilot trials, the digital terrestrial television transition faced many problems. These problems stemmed from the lesser enthusiasm of content providers toward the digitisation, with the exception of Les Copaque, and the need to improve the nation's Internet broadband infrastructure. However, after Abdullah Badawi resigned as Prime Minister in 2008, the project by RTM was deferred indefinitely.

Future 
Although Telekom Malaysia has been rumoured to be builder for a digital terrestrial television infrastructure, TM wishes to improve the broadband infrastructure to increase Internet readiness for the country, which leads to Unifi.

On 8 January 2014, Puncak Semangat was awarded the concession for digital terrestrial television development. The company is obligated to develop the digital terrestrial television infrastructure, which include a digital multimedia hub and a network of high, medium and low-powered digital TV transmitters nationwide that are capable of carrying up to 45 standard-definition or 15 high-definition digital TV channels, for a start. Television and radio services will be offered first while the latter three, connected services (catch-up TV and video on demand), t-commerce (television commerce) and soft services (e-learning applications and SMS voting) will delivered via home broadband networks after the former two.

The first roll-out will start on 16 April 2015 (originally expected to be in the third quarter of 2014), using Puncak Semangat's inside-out rollout strategy where the rural areas will have analogue switch-off first followed by suburbans and eventually urban areas in stages, due to the fact that free-to-air television will benefit rural people while people in urban and suburban areas already have pay television such as Astro and HyppTV. The rollout will complete in 2017  and will cover 98% of Malaysia's population with the capacity of up to 80 television channels and between 30 and 40 radio stations.

Once the full digital platform has been rolled out, television broadcasts in analogue will be terminated.

Analogue switch-off 
Analogue TV broadcasts would have been shut down in stages, due to complete by 2014 as per recommendation from ASEAN. The DTT migration plan was divided into three phases:

 Phase I (2007–2013)
 Analogue TV & DTT co-exist
 Analogue TV shut down in stages
 Vacate other primary services (radar and LMS)
 Phase II (2014–29 September 2019)
 No analogue TV service
 Vacate DTT service using channels 56 and above
 Vacate LMS in band 477 MHz to 478 MHz
 Phase III (30 September 2019 – 31 October 2019)
 100% DTT service using channels 5 to 12 and 21 to 54

Television broadcasts in analogue are originally scheduled for 2017, but the transition will be completed after the full-out of the digital platform. As announced by the Malaysian Communications and Multimedia Commission (MCMC) in late September, the full digital transition to be completed on 31 October 2019, the date where analog TV broadcast for remaining states Sabah and Sarawak will end. The switch over in West Malaysia are fully completed on 1 October at 12:30 AM (UTC+8), while the final switch over in East Malaysia are completed on 31 October also at 12:30 AM as scheduled. This marks the end of analogue television broadcast in Malaysia with the country also becomes the third country in Southeast Asia after Singapore and Brunei to undergo successful transition to digital television broadcast.

Paid terrestrial television 
In 2006, U Television, formerly MiTV, is scheduled to roll out broadcast services in the H.264 video format according to DVB-T, for better picture quality and more efficient frequency bandwidth usage, after having failed in an earlier venture with the IPTV-over-UHF system previously.

Broadband and IPTV 
DETV, a new paid television provider owned by REDtone, provides television and video-on-demand services on the IPTV platform, targeting the Chinese audiences in Malaysia.

TM launched its IPTV services, branded as Hypp.TV in the fourth quarter of 2009, and has completed its trials with 1,000 selected households in Klang Valley, Penang and Kulim, Kedah. The service began in March 2010. However, due to the service being tied down to their Unifi fiber-to-the-home service, availability remains limited to areas covered by the national fiber rollout.

Mobile television 
Mobile television was introduced in Malaysia with video streaming services by mobile telecommunications providers such as Maxis and DiGi, to users of mobile phones with 3G or similar technologies. Maxis TV now offers more than 20 channels to Maxis 3G subscribers who own compatible mobile phones. Yet, Maxis is expected to roll out broadcast mobile TV services based on DVB-H in the near future.

U Mobile also provides broadcast mobile TV to users of selected 3G phones, also based on DVB-H.

In October 2008, Astro launched Astro Mobile TV which currently provides 18 channels, all of which are mobile versions of existing Astro TV channels, including seven in-house channels. This service is only available to Maxis subscribers with compatible 2.5G or 3G handsets, and does not reprise its role from Maxis TV cable television.

In 2012, HyppTV launched the HyppTV Everywhere service to counter the lack of fiber coverage. Initially only available to Unifi subscribers, the service was opened up to the public to compensate for the limited Unifi coverage.

HDTV 
RTM initiated its inaugural high-definition television (HDTV) trials in 2008, with the Beijing Olympic Games, of which RTM test-broadcast the opening and closing ceremony, and several events on HD.

In late 2009, Astro launched Astro B.yond as a personal video recorder and a high-definition television service.

As of July 2013, Media Prima group chief financial officer Mohamad Ariff Ibrahim told that Media Prima will launch high definition (HD) simulcast for one of its four terrestrial television stations as early as the first half of year 2014. But, audiences are still suffered with SD resolution and stretched 4:3 scale format in most 16:9 TV that majority people own nowadays. Media Prima only start to broadcast selected programmes at 16:9 SD starting from 31 December 2016, however the idents, programme previews, adverts, 4:3 contents and some widescreen programmes remain on 4:3 and improperly stretched (sometimes letterboxed).

In early 2015, NJOI began the HD service that will automatically available for free for all NJOI customers starting from 1 February.

See also 
 Digital television transition
 Television in Malaysia

References

External links 
General
 DVB - Malaysia
 Fulfilling Needs For Digital Media, .my Convergence (Jan 2008)
 Technical Standard for Free To Air Digital Terrestrial Receiver (Set-top-box) (MTSFB 001 : 2008)
 TECHNICAL SPECIFICATION FOR FREE TO AIR DIGITAL TERRESTRIAL TELEVISION RECEIVER (SET-TOP-BOX), Malaysian Communications and Multimedia Commission

Providers
 Astro
 Astro Mobile TV 
 Maxis TV
 U Mobile
  DETV
 TM IPTV

Malaysia
Television in Malaysia
Science and technology in Malaysia